Abu Honeyvar (also Romanized as Abū Honeyvar; also known as Abū Hīnvar) is a village in Jarahi Rural District, in the Central District of Mahshahr County, Khuzestan Province, Iran. At the 2006 census, its population was 47, in 10 families.

References 

Populated places in Mahshahr County